Manzanal may refer to some places in Castile and León, Spain:

 Manzanal de Arriba, a municipality of the Province of Zamora
 Manzanal de los Infantes, a municipality of the Province of Zamora
 Manzanal del Barco, a municipality of the Province of Zamora
 Manzanal del Puerto, a village of Villagatón, in the Province of León

See also 
Manzana (disambiguation)